Catherine Olivia Jean Fried (née Boswell; 1 October 1936 – 4 February 2015) was a British artist, photographer, and writer. She was the third wife of the poet Erich Fried, although her own career came to the fore following his death.

Selected works

References

1936 births
2015 deaths
20th-century British artists
21st-century British artists
Photographers from London
British women photographers
20th-century British writers
20th-century British women writers
21st-century British writers
21st-century British women writers